Schuyler is a census-designated place (CDP) in Nelson County, Virginia, United States, close to Scottsville. The population as of the 2010 Census was 298.

In 1882, the community—originally "Walker's Mill"—was named for Schuyler George Walker, local mill operator, and the area's first postmaster.

In the late 19th and early 20th centuries, the community became a small industrial center with the establishment of a stone cutting plant for the area quarries of the Alberene Stone Company, which took the native and acid-resistant soapstone and milled the rock into flat table tops for labs and hospitals. The Great Depression essentially destroyed this industry and the area never fully recovered.
 
Schuyler was the birthplace and home of writer Earl Hamner Jr. He is best known for the CBS television series The Waltons, which was based on his experiences of growing up the eldest child of a large rural family in Depression-era America. Earl and his mother and siblings attended Schuyler Baptist Church near their homestead.  In 2014 a special service was held there to honor Hamner on his last visit to the area; Hamner died two years later.  Country singer Jimmy Fortune participated in the event.

The region suffered greatly from the remnants of Hurricane Camille, which dumped  to  feet of rain in the area in August 1969.

The Schuyler Historic District was listed on the National Register of Historic Places in 2007.

References

External links
Walton's Mountain Museum
The Walton Hamner House 
The Quarry Gardens at Schuyler

Census-designated places in Nelson County, Virginia